Angels of Death is a 1986 compilation album by Hawkwind covering their RCA/Active Records period 1981–1982. It draws from the albums Sonic Attack (1981), Church of Hawkwind (1982) and Choose Your Masques (1982).

Track listing

Side one 
 "Angel Voices" (Harvey Bainbridge, Dr. Technical) – 1:30 – Church of Hawkwind
 "Nuclear Drive" (Dave Brock) – 3:11 – Church of Hawkwind
 "Rocky Paths" (Huw Lloyd-Langton) – 3:55 – Sonic Attack
 "Solitary Mind Games" (Lloyd-Langton) – 4:08 – Choose Your Masques
 "Living on a Knife Edge" (Brock) – 4:42 – Sonic Attack
 "Fahrenheit 451" (Robert Calvert, Brock) – 4:34 – Choose Your Masques
 "Looking in the Future" (Brock) – 4:03 – Church of Hawkwind

Side two 
 "Choose Your Masks" (Brock, Michael Moorcock) – 5:26 – Choose Your Masques
 "The Joker at the Gate" (Bainbridge, Brock) – 1:55 – Church of Hawkwind
 "Waiting for Tomorrow" (Lloyd-Langton) – 3:45 – Choose Your Masques
 "The Last Messiah" (Bainbridge, Brock) – 1:35 – Church of Hawkwind
 "Arrival in Utopia" (Brock, Moorcock) – 5:37 – Choose Your Masques
 "Virgin of the World" (Bainbridge) – 4:09 – Sonic Attack
 "Angels of Death" (Brock) – 5:51 – Sonic Attack

Personnel 
 Dave Brock – vocals (tracks 2,5-8,11,12,14), guitar, keyboards
 Huw Lloyd-Langton – vocals (3,4,10), guitars
 Harvey Bainbridge – vocals (9,13), bass, keyboards
 Martin Griffin – drums

Release history 
 November 1986: RCA, NL71150

References

External links 
 

Hawkwind compilation albums
1986 compilation albums